Eloise Head (born March 23, 1994) is a British social media personality.

Biography
Eloise Head is a self-taught baker, and a qualified Personal Trainer. She is the creator of Fitwaffle.

Career
In March 2020, Head launched an Instagram page called Fitwafflekitchen, the page was created as an Isolation Baking Project as the United Kingdom had gone in to lockdown. Her brand gained national popularity during the COVID-19 pandemic due to the simple recipes.

References

External links
 

1994 births
Living people
People from London
British TikTokers